The 1995–96 Northern Football League season was the 98th in the history of Northern Football League, a football competition in England.

Division One

Division One featured 17 clubs which competed in the division last season, along with three new clubs, promoted from Division Two:
 Crook Town
 Stockton
 Whickham

League table

Division Two

Division Two featured 16 clubs which competed in the division last season, along with four new clubs.
 Clubs relegated from Division One:
 Hebburn
 Northallerton Town
 Prudhoe Town
 Plus:
 South Shields, joined from the Wearside Football League

League table

References

External links
 Northern Football League official site

Northern Football League seasons
1995–96 in English football leagues